Live at The Cellar Door is a live album by the progressive bluegrass Maryland band The Seldom Scene. The Washington Post called it "not only a landmark for the progressive bluegrass scene that originated here in Washington, but may be the band's finest representation on disc."

Track listing
 "Doing My Time" (Jimmie Skinner) 5:38
 "California Cottonfields" (Dallas Frazier, Earl Montgomery) 3:08
 Band Intros 1:15
 "Panhandle Country" (Bill Monroe) 2:13
 "Muddy Waters" (Phil Rosenthal) 3:14
 "Rawhide" (Bill Monroe) 2:41
 "Baby Blue" (Bob Dylan) 3:39
 "City of New Orleans" (Steve Goodman) 3:03
 "Grandfather's Clock" 4:50
 "The Fields Have Turned Brown" (Carter Stanley) 3:15
 "Hit Parade of Love" (Jimmy Martin, Wade Birchfield) 3:18
 "Will the Circle Be Unbroken?" (Traditional; arranged by the Seldom Scene) 3:26
 "Pick Away" (Vic Jordan, Lester Flatt) 2:40
 "Dark Hollow" 2:10
 "Small Exception of Me" (Tony Hatch, Jackie Trent) 3:15
 "If I Were a Carpenter" (Tim Hardin) 3:00
 "Old Gray Bonnet" 2:33
 "C & O Canal" (John Starling) 3:09
 "Georgia Rose" (Bill Monroe) 3:04
 "Colorado Turnaround" (Evelyn Graves) 2:37
 "He Rode All the Way to Texas" (John Starling) 2:36
 "White Line" (Willie P. Bennett) 3:34
 "Rider" (Traditional) 7:10

Personnel
The Seldom Scene
 John Starling - vocals, guitar
 John Duffey - mandolin, vocals
 Ben Eldridge - banjo, guitar, vocals
 Mike Auldridge - Dobro, guitar, vocals
 Tom Gray - bass, vocals

References

External links

The Seldom Scene albums
1975 live albums
Rebel Records live albums